The 2002 Halton Borough Council election took place on 2 May 2002 to elect members of Halton Unitary Council in Cheshire, England. One third of the council was up for election and the Labour Party stayed in overall control of the council.

After the election, the composition of the council was:
Labour 47
Liberal Democrat 7
Conservative 2

Campaign
18 seats were contested in the election, including 2 seats in Norton ward, where a Labour councillor had resigned his seat. The seats being contested included those of the Labour mayor, Chris Loftus, and the Liberal Democrat leader on the council, Alan Taylor. 47 candidates stood in the election, including 3 married couples, with Labour contesting seats in all 17 wards, as compared to 14 for the Conservatives, 9 for the Liberal Democrats and 2 from the Runcorn Labour Councillors Group.

Major issues in the election included housing, concerns over health effects from a local chemical plant and a proposal to close down a recreation centre in Norton. The council was dominated by Labour before the election and this was seen as unlikely to change.

Results
The results saw Labour increase its majority on the council by gaining 3 seats to have 47 councillors, while the Runcorn Labour Councillors Group lost their 2 remaining seats. However the Liberal Democrats won an extra seat in Norton ward to remain the main opposition with 7 seats. Overall turnout in the election was 21.5%.

Ward results

References

2002 English local elections
2002
2000s in Cheshire